is a song recorded by Japanese singer Misia, from her ninth studio album, Just Ballade. It was released by Ariola Japan as the album's sixth single on November 18, 2009. "Aitakute Ima" is the theme song to the first season of the TBS drama series Jin.

Background and release
"Aitakute Ima" was released five months after the previous double A-side single "Ginga" / "Itsumademo". It is Misia's first Japanese television drama tie-in in five years, since the Singer for Singer track "Hoshizora no Katasumi de" served as theme song to the CX drama series Minna Mukashi wa Kodomo Datta (2004). The first pressing of the physical release came housed in a sleeve case with a see-through cutout. The track was released in truetone format prior to the official release date, in sized-down version on October 18, 2009 and in full on November 9, 2009.

Composition
"Aitakute Ima" was written by Misia, while the composition and arrangement were handled by Jun Sasaki. It is composed in the key of G-flat major and set to a common time tempo of 70 beats per minute. Misia's vocals span from F3 to C5. Akihiko Ishimaru, the producer of Jin, stated that he chose Misia to sing the theme song because, when imagining the music for the series, he pictured her "powerful and bittersweet" voice. In an interview with Excite, Misia explained that one of directives given to her by Ishimaru was to not read the original Jin manga series, in order to avoid giving away potential spoilers in the song, she posits. The lyrics were therefore inspired solely by the story's theme of longing and nostalgia. Musically, Ishimaru requested a ballad that utilizes a major cord and that is "emotional but not dark".

The song was recorded while on the Hoshizora no Live V Just Ballade tour. Misia remarked to Excite that she usually tries to take a few days off from singing before a concert, but had to make do with less vocal rest because of her busy recording schedule. She expressed being surprised that the final vocal take for "Aitakute Ima" turned out so well, despite the less than ideal conditions.

Critical reception
CDJournal described the song as a "punchy piano ballad" that "speaks of the fundamental theme of love across time" and praised it for its "evocative power". The Japan Maritime Daily called the song "a beautiful ballad" and praised Misia's "well-matched soulful vocal performance". "Aitakute Ima" won the Television Drama Academy Award for Best Drama Song, off the strength of its popularity with both viewers and critics. In a nationwide poll conducted by Music Station in April 2011, the song was ranked the 19th most memorable theme song to a TV series.

Music video
As of March 2018, the music video for "Aitakute Ima" is the second most viewed video on Misia's official YouTube channel, behind the music video to "Everything", with over 39 million views.

Chart performance
"Aitakute Ima" entered the daily Oricon Singles Chart at number 9. It peaked four days later at number 6. The single debuted at number 9 on the weekly Oricon Singles Chart, with 16,000 copies sold in its first week, making it Misia's first top-ten debut in two years, since "Royal Chocolate Flush" in December 2007. "Aitakute Ima" debuted on the Billboard Japan Hot 100 and Hot Singles Sales charts at number 3 and 9, respectively. The song also appeared on iTunes Japan Store and Mora year-end charts, at number 85 and 44, respectively. The single charted for twelve weeks on the Oricon Singles Chart and sold a reported total of 47,000 copies during its run. The song was certified double platinum, for sales of 500,000 truetones, and triple platinum, for sales of 750,000 of single track downloads, by the Recording Industry Association of Japan.

Track listing

Credits and personnel
Personnel

 Lead vocals – Misia
 Backing vocals, backing vocal arrangement – JP
 Songwriting – Misia, Jun Sasaki
 Arrangement, all other instruments – Jun Sasaki
 Orchestral arrangement – Gen Itettsu
 Piano – Tohru Shigemi
 Drums – Fuyu
 Acoustic guitar – Shuhei Yamaguchi
 Electric guitar – Takashi Yamaguchi
 Bass – Takeshi Taneda
 Strings – Gen Ittetsu Strings
 French horn – Hiroyuki Minami, Hiroyuki Nakajima
 Flute – Hideyo Takakuwa
 Harp – Tomoyuki Asakawa
 Engineering – Masahiro Kawaguchi, Ken Nishi
 Mixing – Masahiro Kawaguchi
 Mastering – Herb Powers Jr.

Charts

Certifications

Release history

References

External links
 Aitakute Ima Special Site

2009 singles
2009 songs
Misia songs
Japanese television drama theme songs
Songs written by Misia
Songs written by Jun Sasaki
Song recordings produced by Jun Sasaki
Ariola Japan singles
+